The 1923–24 Arkansas Razorbacks men's basketball team represented the University of Arkansas in the 1923–24 college basketball season. They played their home games in Schmidt Gymnasium. Francis Schmidt coached the Hogs in their first ever basketball season. The Razorbacks went 17–11, with a 3–9 record in Southwest Conference play, finishing seventh in the league.

Roster

Schedule and Results
Schedule retrieved from HogStats.com.

References

Arkansas Razorbacks
Arkansas Razorbacks men's basketball seasons